Birdseye is an unincorporated community in southeastern Utah County, Utah, United States.

Description
The community is located on the back of the Wasatch Range, southeast of Loafer Mountain along U.S. Route 89 at the confluence of Bennie Creek and Thistle Creek.

Birdseye was settled in 1885 and originally named Summit Basin and later Clinton. The present name "Birdseye" was chosen because of the nearby birdseye marble located in the quarries near Indianola.

Notable person
Shawn Nelson - Born in Birdseye, he was a plumber and U.S. Army veteran who stole an M60A3 Patton tank from a U.S. National Guard armory in San Diego, California and went on a rampage on May 17, 1995.

See also

References

External links

Unincorporated communities in Utah County, Utah
Populated places established in 1885
Unincorporated communities in Utah
1885 establishments in Utah Territory
Provo–Orem metropolitan area